This is a list of notable educational institutions in Pokhara, Nepal.

Higher education
 Western Regional Campus for Engineering
 Institute of Forestry
 Prithivi Narayan Campus
 Pokhara University
 Pokhara Engineering College
 Manipal College of Medical Sciences
 Gandaki College of Engineering and Science
Janapriya Multiple Campus
Novel Academy
LA GRANDEE International College
Pokhara College Of Management
Informatics College Pokhara
Mount Annapurna Campus
Nepal Tourism and Hotel Management College
Kantipur Tourism and Hotel Management College
Gupteshwor Mahadev Multiple Campus
Kalika Multiple Campus
Kanya Campus
Bhadrakali Multiple Campus
Bindhyabasini Campus
Charak Hospital Nursing College
Gandaki Medical College
Infomax College of Information Technology and Management
Lake City College and Research Centre
Laxmi Adarsha Multiple College

High schools

 Adarsha English Boarding School
 Anjuli Secondary Boarding School, Pokhara-1, Purano Tundikhel
 Bal Mandir Secondary School, Nadipur Pokhara-3
 Bal Kalyan Secondary school
 Bal Vidhya Mandir Secondary Boarding School, Miya Patan, Kundahar
 Basline Academy School, Kundahar-12
 Bhasker Memorial School, Phoolbari-11
 Bidur English Boarding High School
 Bir Lower Secondary School, Lekhnath-2, Rithepani, Kaski
 Bishwo Shanti Higher Secondary School, Deurali-2, Kaski
 Brahma Rupa Secondary School, Pokhara-32, Rajako Chautara, Kaski
 Children's Academy
 Choreptan higher secondary school, Chorepatan Pokhara
 Cosmos International College
 Diamond Higher Secondary School, Talchowk, Lekhnath, Kaski
 Disneyland academy, Masbar 7 Pokhara
 Dynamic Academy, Simalchour, Pokhara, Kaski
 Gandaki Boarding School
 Gurukul Bidhya Sadan, Newroad(Ahead of Pokhara Metroplitan Office)

 Fishtail Higher Secondary Boarding School

 Global Collegiate Higher Secondary School, Ranipauwa
 Gogan Higher Secondary School, Lekhnath-13, Gagangauda, Kaski
 Golden Future Boarding Higher Secondary School
 Gorkha English Boarding School
Gyankunj Vidyashram, Lekhnath-08, Mohariya
 Hill Point Boarding School, Matepani
 Hill Side English Boarding School, Nayapool, Kaski
 Himalayan Boarding School, Gharipatan, Pokhara-17
 Himanchal Boarding School
 Janapriya Uccha Madhyamik Vidhalaya
 Jyotikunj Education Foundation Rambazar.
 Kaski Mordenized Academy,Chauthe-14
 Krishna Prasad Devkota Higher Secondary School, Lumle Kaski
 Kumudini Homes
 L.P. Devkota Memorial English Boarding School, Pardi Birauta
 Laxmi Awasiya Higher Secondary School, Newroad
 Little Step Higher Secondary Boarding School, Simalchaur
 Lotus Academic School, Naya bazar, Pokhara
 Manakamana secondary boarding school, Fulbari
 Marigold Boarding School, Nayagaun
 Metropolitan Academy, Ramghat
 Morning Star Higher Secondary Boarding School, Naudada-3 kaski
 Motherland Higher Secondary School, Masbar 7, Kaski
 Mount Annapurna Higher Secondary School, Nadipur, Pokhara
 Mount Everest Boarding School
 Nawa Prabhat Secondary School. Pokhara-9, Naya Bazar
 National Boarding Secondary School, Baidam
 National Inventive Secoandary Boarding School, Baidam
 Nepal Adarsha Awasiya Vidhyalaya
New Galaxy Higher Secondary School, Nadipur, Pokhara
 New Millennium Academy
 New Model Higher Secondary School, Nagdhunga, Pokhara-8
 Paramount Secondary School
 Pashchimanchal Higher Secondary School, Gairapatan, Pokhara-4
 Pokhara Academy
 Pokhara Higher Secondary School, Bhimkalipatan 1, Bagar
 Pokhara Public School
 Pragati English Boarding School
 Prativa Higher secondary school, Ramghat-10
 Rainbow Academy
 Ram Prathamik Vidhyalaya
 Rastriya Higher Secondary School, Pokhara tudikhel -1, Kaski
 Sagarmatha Niketan Higher Secondary School
 Sainik Awasiya Mahavidyalaya, Pokhara
 Shanti Nikunja Boarding School, Birauta
Saraswati Adarsha Vidyashram, Lamachour
 Shantideep School, Majheri Patan
 Shishu Kalyan English Secondary School, Chhorepata
 Shishu Niketan Higher Secondary School
Shree Amarsingh Model Higher Secondary School, Amarsingh Chowk
 Shree gyan jyoti secondary school, Armala
 Shree Ratna Jyoti Higher Secondary School, Rantna Chowk
 Sarswati Higher Secondary School
 Siddhartha Secondary Boarding School
 Siddivinayak Boarding School
SOS Hermann Gmeiner Secondary School, Rambazar
 Spiral Galaxy Higher Secondary School, Simpani-1, Pokhara
Srijana Secondary School, Phirke
St. Mary's Higher Secondary School
 Step By Step higher Secondary School, Masbar, Pokhara
Sublime Secondary School, Ratnachowk
 Tarakunj English Boarding School, Kahaun Khola-13
 Tarapunja education academy, Adhikari tole Pokhara
 Tops Boarding School, Ramghat
 Gurukul Higher Secondary School,New rd Pokhara

Other training facilities

References 

Pokhara
Pokhara